Alma Bazel Androzzo (17 October 1912 - 11 October 2001) was an American composer, pianist and songwriter.

Biography 
Alma Androzzo was born Alma Irene Bazel in Harriman, Tennessee, USA. She had no formal musical education but was introduced to the piano at the age of five by her father Carl Frederick Bazel, who was a truck driver.

Androzzo was brought up in Philadelphia where she graduated from high school.

In 1934, she married her first husband Andree Androzzo, a chef born in Morocco. Between 1934 and 1940 they lived in Pittsburgh, Pennsylvania. Her second marriage in 1957 was to a motor mechanic, Royal H Thompson, in Chicago.

Her most famous song If I can help somebody was first recorded by Turner Layton in 1946. Since then it has been recorded by many other artists including Gracie Fields, Billy Eckstein, Harry Secombe, Doris Day, Mahalia Jackson, Joseph Locke, Liberarce and Bryn Terfel.

She is buried in Mount Hope Cemetery, Chicago.

Published songs 
 If I can help somebody published by Boosey & Hawkes Ltd., London 1945 
 Bless His name published by Martin and Morris Music Inc., Chicago Illinois 1950
 Keep marching on published by Martin and Morris Music Inc., Chicago Illinois 1950
 Deliver me from evil published by Martin and Morris Music Inc., Chicago Illinois 1950
 I'll make it somehow published by Martin and Morris Music Inc., Chicago Illinois 1950
 I will walk with Jesus published by Martin and Morris Music Studio, Chicago Illinois 1952
 He's such a great Saviour published by Martin and Morris Music Studio, Chicago Illinois c.1952
 Little me published by Hill and Range Songs Inc., New York City 1956 
 Live in the sunlight published by Boosey & Hawkes, London 1964
 I have something to give copyright Alma Bazel Androzzo 17 January 1972

References

External links 
 

 

1912 births
2001 deaths
African-American women composers
African-American composers
American women composers
Songwriters from Tennessee
20th-century American women musicians
20th-century American musicians
American women songwriters
20th-century American composers
People from Harriman, Tennessee
Musicians from Philadelphia
Songwriters from Pennsylvania
20th-century women composers
African-American songwriters
African-American women musicians
20th-century African-American women
20th-century African-American people
20th-century African-American musicians